A vision panel is a small window in a door which allows people to look through without opening the door.  Vision panels are sometimes in walls, generally adjacent to a door.

These have implications in safety, primarily to avoid opening doors on a person coming the other way, but also in case of fire to avoid opening a door onto a fire.

They should be used on doors which open both ways, and doors which subdivide corridors.

In a fire door it is important that the vision panel is rated at the same level as the fire door requirements, otherwise the vision panel will fail before the rest of the door.

The height of the panel needs to take into consideration the viewing level of users, for example those in wheelchairs or children.  As a consequence  panels are often long, or, in the case of wall viewing panels, floor to ceiling.

The UK Building regulations say:

See also
 Door furniture

References

Passive fire protection